The School of Music at Ithaca College is the music school at Ithaca College, in Ithaca, New York. It is one of the five schools of the college. Ithaca College was founded by William Egbert in 1892 as a conservatory of music.  Since 1941, the School of Music has been accredited by the National Association of Schools of Music.

Academics
The School of Music offers degree programs in:

Undergraduate
 Composition (B.M.)
 Jazz Studies (B.M.)
 Music (B.A.)
 Music Education (B.M.)
 Music in Combination with an Outside Field (B.M.)
 Performance (B.M.)
 Performance and Music Education (B.M.)
 Sound Recording Technology (B.M.)

Graduate
 Music Education (M.M., M.S.)

External links

Music schools in New York (state)
Ithaca College